Made in Japan is a live album by French group Deep Forest, released in 1999.

The recording took place on 9 September 1998, during Deep Forest's tour in Japan, with nine musicians joining the group on the stage. The band placed an emphasis on improvisation and playing the songs differently from the recordings. The voices of the three singers were mixed with pre-recorded samples. More than 150,000 copies of the album have been sold.

Track listing
All tracks composed by Éric Mouquet and Michel Sanchez
"Ekue Ekue" – 5:18  
"Green and Blue" – 6:00 
"Deep Weather" – 6:16 
"Tres Marias" (Japanese Edition Bonus Track) – 6:22
"Bohemian Ballet" – 6:16 
"Deep Folk Song" – 2:26 
"Freedom Cry" – 4:04 
"Cafe Europa" – 5:48 
"Forest Power" – 6:06 
"Hunting" – 6:37
"Forest Hymn" – 5:22
"Sweet Lullaby" – 6:20
"White Whisper" (Japanese Edition Bonus Track) – 5:06
"Madazulu" – 5:01

Personnel
Didier Cresson - bass
Neil Conti - drums 
Paolo Damanti - keyboards
Michel Sanchez - keyboards, accordion, piano 
Éric Mouquet - keyboards, vocoder, Zendrums 
Fred Savinien-Caprais - percussion
Gabrielle Raharimalala, Gino Ceccarelli, Monique Rasoanirina - vocals
Technical
Yoshiyasu Kumada - recording

References

External links 
 Details and samples from Made in Japan

Deep Forest albums
1999 live albums
Live electronic albums